Hallensia is an extinct genus of perissodactyl.

References

Odd-toed ungulates
Prehistoric mammal genera